Coleraine Grammar School is a co-educational grammar school in Coleraine, County Londonderry, Northern Ireland that was established in 2015 following the amalgamation of Coleraine Academical Institution and Coleraine High School. The school is currently split over two campuses in Coleraine. The premises on the Lodge Road houses Years 8 - 10 whereas the Y11 - Y14 pupils attend school on the Castlerock Road.

References 

Grammar schools in County Londonderry
Educational institutions established in 2015
2015 establishments in Northern Ireland